Hélios Latchoumanaya (born 4 June 2000) is a French Paralympic judoka of Guadelopean descent. At the 2020 Summer Paralympics, he won a bronze medal in the men's 90 kg event. He has also won two European silver medals in the same weight category.

References

External links
 
 

2000 births
Living people
Sportspeople from Tarbes
French male judoka
Paralympic judoka of France
Paralympic bronze medalists for France
Paralympic medalists in judo
Judoka at the 2020 Summer Paralympics
Medalists at the 2020 Summer Paralympics
21st-century French people